is a Japanese voice actor affiliated with Aoni Production.

Biography

Filmography

Anime

Films

Video games

Tokusatsu

Dubbing

Drama CDs

References

External links
Official agency profile 
Tetsu Inada at Ryu's Seiyuu Infos

1972 births
Living people
Aoni Production voice actors
Japanese male video game actors
Japanese male voice actors
Male voice actors from Tokyo Metropolis
Voice actors from Hachiōji, Tokyo
20th-century Japanese male actors
21st-century Japanese male actors